The Men's Super-G in the 2018 FIS Alpine Skiing World Cup involved six events including the final in Åre, Sweden. Norwegian skier Kjetil Jansrud, the defending champion in the discipline, won two of the first five races and finished second in two more, clinching the crystal globe for the season before the final.

The season was interrupted by the 2018 Winter Olympics from 12-24 February 2018 at Yongpyong Alpine Centre (slalom and giant slalom) at the Alpensia Sports Park in PyeongChang and at the Jeongseon Alpine Centre (speed events) in Jeongseon, South Korea.  The men's Super-G was held on 16 February, one day later than originally scheduled due to other postponements.

Standings

DNF = Did Not Finish
DSQ = Disqualified
DNS = Did Not Start

See also
 2018 Alpine Skiing World Cup – Men's summary rankings
 2018 Alpine Skiing World Cup – Men's Overall
 2018 Alpine Skiing World Cup – Men's Downhill
 2018 Alpine Skiing World Cup – Men's Giant Slalom
 2018 Alpine Skiing World Cup – Men's Slalom
 2018 Alpine Skiing World Cup – Men's Combined
 World Cup scoring system

References

External links
 Alpine Skiing at FIS website

Men's Super-G
FIS Alpine Ski World Cup men's Super-G discipline titles